James Stone Chrisman (September 14, 1818 – July 29, 1881) was an antebellum United States Representative from Kentucky and then a member of the Confederate States Congress during the American Civil War.

Chrisman was born in Monticello, Kentucky, where he attended the common schools. He engaged in agricultural pursuits and studied law. He was admitted to the bar in 1849 and commenced practice in Monticello.

Chrisman was an unsuccessful candidate for election to the Kentucky House of Representatives in 1845 and 1847. He was a delegate to the Kentucky constitutional convention in 1849 and was elected as a Democrat to the Thirty-third Congress (March 4, 1853 - March 3, 1855). He unsuccessfully contested the election of William C. Anderson to the Thirty-sixth Congress, losing in a race that at one time was tied but at the time Congress started session was decided by 3 votes. A later review would increase that to 169 votes.

During the Civil War, Chrisman served as a representative from Kentucky to the First and Second Confederate Congresses from 1862 to 1865. After the war, he served as a member of the Kentucky House of Representatives 1869–71. Later, he resumed the practice of law in Monticello, where he died in 1881. He was buried in a private cemetery on his farm.

References

Specific

1818 births
1881 deaths
People from Monticello, Kentucky
Kentucky lawyers
Democratic Party members of the Kentucky House of Representatives
Members of the Confederate House of Representatives from Kentucky
Democratic Party members of the United States House of Representatives from Kentucky
19th-century American politicians
19th-century American lawyers